Brilliant Orange: The Neurotic Genius of Dutch Football is a book by David Winner, first published in 2000. It looks at the development of football in the Netherlands from the 1960s onwards, and at how the footballing culture reflected changes in wider Dutch culture. The book was shortlisted for the William Hill Sports Book of the Year in 2000.

References

Association football books
2000 non-fiction books
Johan Cruyff